Bioastronautics is a specialty area of biological and astronautical research which encompasses numerous aspects of biological, behavioral, and medical concern governing humans and other living organisms in a space flight environment; and includes design of payloads, space habitats, and life-support systems.  In short, it spans the study and support of life in space.

Bioastronautics includes many similarities with its sister discipline astronautical hygiene; they both study the hazards that humans may encounter during a space flight.  However, astronautical hygiene differs in many respects e.g. in this discipline, once a hazard is identified, the exposure risks are then assessed and the most effective measures determined to prevent or control exposure and thereby protect the health of the astronaut.  Astronautical hygiene is an applied scientific discipline that requires knowledge and experience of many fields including bioastronautics, space medicine, ergonomics etc.  The skills of astronautical hygiene are already being applied for example, to characterise moon dust and design the measures to mitigate exposure during lunar exploration, to develop accurate chemical monitoring techniques and use the results in the setting SMACs.    

Of particular interest from a biological perspective are the effects of reduced gravitational force felt by inhabitants of spacecraft.  Often referred to as "microgravity", the lack of sedimentation, buoyancy, or convective flows in fluids results in a more quiescent cellular and intercellular environment primarily driven by chemical gradients.  Certain functions of organisms are mediated by gravity, such as gravitropism in plant roots and negative gravitropism in plant stems, and without this stimulus growth patterns of organisms onboard spacecraft often diverge from their terrestrial counterparts.  Additionally, metabolic energy normally expended in overcoming the force of gravity remains available for other functions.  This may take the form of accelerated growth in organisms as diverse as worms like C. elegans to miniature parasitoid wasps such as Spangia endius.  It may also be used in the augmented production of secondary metabolites such as the vinca alkaloids Vincristine and Vinblastine in the rosy periwinkle (Catharanthus roseus), whereby space grown specimens often have higher concentrations of these constituents that on earth are present in only trace amounts.

From an engineering perspective, facilitating the delivery and exchange of air, food, and water, and the processing of waste products is also challenging.  The transition from expendable physicochemical methods to sustainable bioregenerative systems that function as a robust miniature ecosystem is another goal of bioastronautics in facilitating long duration space travel.  Such systems are often termed Closed Ecological Life Support Systems (CELSS).

From a medical perspective, long duration space flight also has physiological impacts on astronauts.  Accelerated bone decalcification, similar to osteopenia and osteoporosis on Earth, is just one such condition. Study of these effects is useful not only in advancing methods for safe habitation of and travel through space, but also in uncovering ways to more effectively treat the related terrestrial ailments.

NASA's Johnson Space Center in Houston, Texas maintains a Bioastronautics Library (map). The one-room facility provides a collection of textbooks, reference books, conference proceedings, and academic journals related to bioastronautics topics. Because the library is located within secure government property (not part of Space Center Houston, the official visitors center of JSC), it is not generally accessible to the public.

See also
 Effect of spaceflight on the human body
 Life support system
 Space habitation
 Locomotion in space
 Reduced muscle mass, strength and performance in space
 Space food
 Astronautical hygiene
 Spaceflight radiation carcinogenesis
 Space medicine
 Sex in space
 Space tourism
 Space-based economy
 List of spaceflight-related accidents and incidents
 Writing in space
 Space art#Art in space
 Religion in space
 Organisms at high altitude
 Astrobiology
 Astrobotany
 Plants in space

References

External links
Harvard-MIT Health Sciences and Technology - Bioastronautics Training Program (HST-Bioastro) 
NASA's Bioastronautics Roadmap 
University of Colorado at Boulder Bioastronautics Research Group 
The American Society for Gravitational and Space Biology (ASGSB)  
1965 radio series titled Their Other World, 13 half-hour episodes with typed transcript . 

Aviation medicine
Human spaceflight
Biological engineering
Space medicine